Burkett may refer to:

Places 
Burkett, Texas, unincorporated community in Coleman County, Texas, United States
Burkett Islands, group of small islands lying just west of Mount Gleadell in the eastern part of Amundsen Bay, in Enderby Land
Burkett Nunatak, 2180 metres high, 2 km east of Minaret Nunatak, in the Monument Nunataks, Victoria Land, Antarctica

People with the surname 
B. G. Burkett, author of the book Stolen Valor
Bartine Burkett (1898–1994), American film actress
Bill Burkett, CBS source in the Killian documents affair of 2004
Brendan Burkett (born 1963), Australian swimmer who won five medals at four Paralympics
Cary Burkett, American radio broadcaster and former comic book writer
Chris Burkett (born 1962), former professional American football player
Christopher Burkett (born 1951), American landscape photographer
Daniel Burkett (born 1995), Canadian racing driver
Elinor Burkett (born 1946), American producer, director, journalist and author
Elmer Burkett (1867–1935), Representative and a Senator from Nebraska
F. Michael Burkett (born 1948), attorney and Democratic politician from Idaho
Garth Burkett (1927–2012), Australian footballer
Graham Burkett (1936–2014), Australian politician
Jack Burkett (born 1942), English former footballer
Jackie Burkett (1936–2017), former American football center
Jason Burkett, character in the film Into the Abyss
Jeff Burkett (1921–1947), American football player
Jesse Burkett (1868–1953), former Major League Baseball player
John Burkett (born 1964), former Major League Baseball pitcher
Larry Burkett (1939–2003), American author and radio personality
Mary Burkett (1924–2014), English gallery curator
Michael Burkett (disambiguation)
Michael John Burkett (born 1967), American musician, known as Fat Mike, in the punk rock band NOFX
Neil Burkett (born 1948), South African bowler
N. J. Burkett (born 1962), correspondent for WABC-TV in the United States
Ronnie Burkett (born 1957), Canadian puppeteer
Seth Burkett (born 1991), English professional footballer
Walter Burkett (born 1931), German scholar of Greek mythology and cult

People with the given name 
Myles Burkett Foster (1825–1899), popular English illustrator, watercolour artist and engraver
James Burkett Hartle (born 1939), American physicist from Baltimore

Other uses 
Burkett Restaurant Equipment, food-service equipment and supplies dealer, headquartered in Toledo, Ohio, USA
White Burkett Miller Center of Public Affairs, non-partisan research institute, part of the University of Virginia

See also
Burkitt
Buket (born 1983), graffiti artist
Burk (disambiguation)